Appassionatamente (i.e. "Passionately") is a 1954 Italian  melodrama film  directed by Giacomo Gentilomo and starring Amedeo Nazzari and Myriam Bru. It is loosely based on the drama play La Dame de Saint-Tropez by Auguste Anicet-Bourgeois and Adolphe d'Ennery.

Cast 

Amedeo Nazzari as Andrea Morandi
Myriam Bru as  Elena D'Alberti
Andrea Checchi as Antonio
Umberto Melnati as  Duprè
Vera Carmi as  Paola
Isa Barzizza as  Ortensia Duprè
Giorgio De Lullo as  Carlo
 Antonio Machì as  Giacomo
Maria Zanoli as  Maria
  as  Giorgio D'Alberti
Maria Pia Casilio as  Giannina
Enzo Biliotti as The Minister

References

External links

1954 films
1954 drama films
Italian drama films
Films directed by Giacomo Gentilomo
Films scored by Nino Rota
Italian films based on plays
Melodrama films
Italian black-and-white films
1950s Italian films